Inverkeithing United Football Club are a Scottish football club based in Inverkeithing, Fife, who won the Scottish Junior Cup in 1912–13. The club was reformed in 2017 as community football club.

History
The club began as a Juvenile side, Inverkeithing Renton, in 1906 and won the Fife Juvenile Cup in 1910–11. Renton changed their name to United when stepping up to the Junior grade in 1912. The club won the Scottish Junior Cup in their debut season at this level, defeating Dunipace Juniors 1–0 at Firhill Park, Glasgow in front of a crowd of 9,564. They were the first club from Fife to win the Junior Cup, and remained the only one to do so until St Andrews United triumphed in 1960.

The club played on through World War I using scratch sides drawn from military personnel then enjoyed local success in Fife before going into abeyance in 1927 due to ground issues. Rejoining in 1929, the club continued to pick up local honours but United closed down for a second time at the beginning of World War II. They reformed as a Juvenile side after the war, but only played one further season at Junior level in 1958–59. The club closed completely in 1963.

Their Ballast Bank ground was used many years later by another Junior side, Dunfermline Jubilee Athletic, who arrived from Cowdenbeath in 1973 and left for Pitreavie Stadium in 1989. Jubilee are a predecessor of the current Rosyth.

Honours
Scottish Junior Cup
Winners: 1912–13

Other honours
Fife County League winners: 1919–20, 1933–34
Fife Junior Cup winners: 1925–26
Cowdenbeath Cup winners: 1912–13, 1921–22, 1922–23, 1926–27
Dunfermline Cup winners: 1925–26, 1931–32, 1932–33, 1933–34
Fife Shield winners: 1919–20, 1923–24

References

Association football clubs established in 1906
Association football clubs disestablished in 1963
Scottish Junior Football Association clubs
Defunct football clubs in Scotland
1906 establishments in Scotland
1963 disestablishments in Scotland
Football clubs in Fife
Inverkeithing